The Haunting of Lin-Manuel Miranda is a play by American writer Ishmael Reed. It critiques the acclaimed historical musical Hamilton (2015) through a depiction of a fictionalized version of Hamiltons creator Lin-Manuel Miranda, who is visited by several historical figures missing from the musical in a style similar to Charles Dickens' 1843 novella A Christmas Carol. The play echoes many critiques made by historians, such as the whitewashing of Alexander Hamilton.

Reed debuted the play in January 2019 with a four-night reading at the Nuyorican Poets Cafe, and the play was fully staged in May 2019 and ran for several weeks in the same location. The Haunting received mixed reviews from critics.

Background and development 
Reed wrote a critique of the musical Hamilton shortly after its debut for the August 2015 edition of the magazine CounterPunch, titled "Hamilton: the Musical: Black Actors Dress Up like Slave Traders... and It's Not Halloween." In it he accused Lin-Manuel Miranda of whitewashing Alexander Hamilton's role as a slave owner and his involvement in the genocide of Native Americans. Reed followed this with a second critique for the magazine in April 2016, titled "Hamilton and the Negro Whisperers: Miranda's Consumer Fraud." Reed likened the casting of a Black actor in the role of George Washington to a scenario where Jewish actors would portray Nazi officials Joseph Goebbels, Adolf Eichmann, and Adolf Hitler.

The Haunting  offers Reed's critiques of Hamilton, which include "turning a blind eye to the Schuyler family's ownership of slaves and soft-pedaling Alexander Hamilton's elitist politics and his attitude toward slavery." Reed stated that his goal for writing The Haunting was to "be a counter-narrative to the text that has been distributed to thousands of students throughout the country." Journalist Emil Guillermo observed: "Reed’s play had an Off-Broadway run at the Nuyorican Café in New York last year, but he’d still like to see Miranda come clean about the theatrical juggernaut he created. Because it’s toning down the hate that’s in the history. So people dance and rhyme to a hip hop beat, does that forgive Hamilton’s family, kneed-deep in slavery as slave holders in upstate New York? The musical glorifies Hamilton and his connections. Someone needs to tell the hipsters Hamilton wasn’t as hip as Lin Manuel-Miranda said. Sure, putting blacks and people of color is a great diversity trick. But the truth still has to count for something."

Reviewers noted that Reed's perspectives are shared by many historians, who levied critiques about the historical accuracy of Hamilton after its release. Critics also noted that The Haunting fits with Reed's long career of questioning white supremacy in cultural institutions, such as in his novel Mumbo Jumbo (1972); Nawal Arjini wrote in The Nation that "[b]oth works attempt, with varying degrees of success, to reimagine the history taught in school as one in which people of color have power."  Lauren Kane wrote in The Paris Review that "Reed’s play is aware of how sticky historical moralizing can be, taking aim even at itself as the spirits bicker about land rights, and while the script is smart in presenting how the project of correcting one another’s perspective on history can divide when it should unite, it doesn’t pull punches or mince words. Reed makes Miranda his main character not to crucify the man himself (though there are a few Mary Poppins jabs) but rather to use him as a way of mirroring our hopepunk society, seduced so quickly by easy answers to difficult questions—even more so if those answers come with a catchy hip-hop number. Reed depicts Miranda as a well-meaning pawn in the white capitalist game...."  The research behind Reed's concept was redeemed when The New York Times showed that Hamilton was indeed a slavemaster. CounterPunch editor Jeffrey St. Clair said this vindicated Ishmael Reed.

Plot summary 
After taking Ambien given to him by his agent, Hamilton creator Lin-Manuel Miranda is visited by the spirits of the historical figures George Washington and Alexander Hamilton, and spirits representing those left out of his musical, including enslaved Africans, Native Americans, a white indentured servant, and Harriet Tubman. In a dream, Washington and Hamilton reveal their contempt for Africans and Native Americans. After Miranda wakes up, the other spirits appear to inform Miranda about their lives, while Lin-Manuel appears confused. He continuously defers to Ron Chernow’s 2004 biography Alexander Hamilton to justify the content of the musical. After Lin-Manuel becomes convinced by the spirits' accounts of their lives and the consequences of the actions of Washington and Hamilton, he goes to confront Chernow, who is unapologetic. At the conclusion, Lin-Manuel's agent tells him he has been commissioned to write a play about Christopher Columbus. Throughout, the play critiques Hamilton's high ticket prices and "corny" songs.

Cast 

 Jesse Bueno as Lin-Manuel Miranda
 Robert Turner as the spirit of the historical figure George Washington
 Erika Pizarro as Venus, the spirit of the historical figure who was a slave owned by George Washington's sister-in-law, Hannah Washington, whose son, West Ford, is believed to have been fathered by George Washington
 Zachary Clarence as the spirit of the historical figure Alexander Hamilton
 N. Allam Forster as The Agent
 Tommie J. Moore as Ben, the spirit of a historical figure, a slave owned by the Schuyler family
 Pepsi Robinson as Native American Man, a spirit representing Native Americans living at the time of George Washington and Hamilton
 Vanessa Lovestone as Native American Woman, a spirit representing Native Americans living at the time of Washington and Hamilton
 Malika Iman as Negro Woman, the spirit of a historical figure known as Negro woman with child, who with her child was sold by Alexander Hamilton according to his expense account
 Roz Fox as Harriet Tubman, the spirit of the historical figure
 Lisa Pakulski as Indentured Servant, the spirit of a female indentured servant, one of many who worked for the Schuyler family at the mansion in Albany, New York
 Monisha Shiva as the spirit of the historical figure, Diana, a valued slave first owned by the Schuyler family, who, after being sold by the Schuylers, is known to have died running away from her second master
 Tom Angelo as Ron Chernow

Productions 
Reed hosted a debut reading of the two-act play at Nuyorican Poets Café in January 2019. Reed stated at the initial reading that the play is meant to critique Miranda for his "shoddy research" rather than portray him as a villain. It ran for four nights and simultaneously served as a fundraiser for a full-length production. It sold out each night. The fundraiser was successful, and Reed stated in an interview that Toni Morrison made the second-largest contribution to the campaign, with writer/activist Robert Mailer Anderson playing the role of historian Ron Chernow for the first four staged readings in January 2019.

The Haunting of Lin-Manuel Miranda premiered a full staging at the Nuyorican Poets Café on May 23, 2019 and ran through June 16, 2019. It ran a second time, from October 4–27, 2019, in the same location.

It was directed by Rome Neal. Similar to Hamilton, several of the characters are played by actors of different races, such as Robert Turner, a black actor who portrays George Washington.

Critical reception 
In a New Yorker profile, "Ishmael Reed Gets the Last Laugh," Julian Lucas observed, "Not a few people first learned Ishmael Reed's name two years ago with the debut of his play The Haunting of Lin-Manuel Miranda. Critiques of Hamilton had already addressed its Black-cast renovation of a fraudulent national mythology, but the news that someone hated the musical enough to stage a play about it caused a minor sensation. For those familiar with Reed's work, the drama was even more irresistible: a founding father of American multiculturalism was calling bullshit on its Broadway apotheosis."

The play received mixed critical reception. Critics spoke positively of the acting, the "wit" of Reed's script, and the "catharsis" of Miranda's character being dressed down in the play. Nawal Arjini of The Nation commented positively on the quality of the acting, stating in their review, "Turning what are essentially history lectures into riveting theater is a tall order for most actors, but the cast is for the most part up to the challenge." Critics also noted that the play ends by painting Miranda's fictionalized character with a sympathetic brush, as someone who has been taken advantage of by institutional powerholders, a notion Reed supported in an interview for Current Affairs.

Negative criticisms of the play described it as overly didactic. In a review for The New York Times, Elizabeth Vincentelli stated, "The Haunting is classic activist theater—the haphazard acting is typical of the genre—that prefers didacticism to dialectic. Miranda merely submits to a series of impassioned monologues, a format that saps the show of the energy that would have been generated by back-and-forth exchange." The play was mocked by Peter Sagal of NPR's quiz show Wait Wait... Don't Tell Me!, who expressed disbelief that anyone could dislike "the most beloved musical of modern times."

The reading was also described as low-energy and "boring" by Jeremy Gordon of The Outline, who said "even though the reading couldn't be judged as a completed play—only a few of the actors were in costume, and there was no set nor action—it was hard to imagine how Miranda getting educated in long, unbroken chunks of dialogue could be staged in an interesting way." Similarly, Hua Hsu of The New Yorker wrote, "Some of the history lessons were long-winded and meandering—and maybe slightly confusing without a basic grasp of the original musical... The Haunting of Lin-Manuel Miranda is a minor entry in an important and sometimes overwhelming body of work."

After the reading, Twitter users questioned the validity of the play after critics noted that Reed had not seen Hamilton. In an interview, Reed stated that he had "extensively studied" the script before writing The Haunting. However, by the time the full production premiered, Reed was able to insert a joke in the script concerning how he had missed a mortgage payment to see the show, as performed by the national touring company in San Francisco.

Book 
The Haunting of Lin-Manuel Miranda was published in book form by Archway Editions (distributed by Simon & Schuster) on October 20, 2020.

References 

2019 plays
Hamilton (musical)
Lin-Manuel Miranda
Plays about race and ethnicity
Plays about screenwriters
Plays about slavery
African-American plays
Cultural depictions of George Washington
Cultural depictions of Alexander Hamilton
Works about plays